The 2019 Diriyah ePrix (officially the 2019 ABB FIA Formula E Saudia Diriyah ePrix) was a pair Formula E electric car race held at the Riyadh Street Circuit in the town of Diriyah, north-west of Riyadh, in Saudi Arabia on 22 and 23 November 2019. It formed the first and second rounds of the 2019–20 Formula E season and was the second edition of the Diriyah ePrix. The first race was won by Sam Bird with Andre Lotterer and Stoffel Vandoorne completing the podium. Alexander Sims won the second race.

Classification

Race one

Qualifying

Notes:
  – Nico Müller and James Calado were disqualified from the session after disrespecting Parc fermé regulations in order to allow repairs to their damaged cars. The Stewards allowed Müller and Calado to start from the back of the grid.

Race

Notes:
  – Brendon Hartley received a ten-second time penalty for being unable to fulfill the complete time of the second attack mode.
  – Ma Qinghua received a drive-through penalty converted into a 24-second time penalty for not respecting the homologated throttle pedal map.
  – Fastest in group stage.
  – Pole position.
  – Fastest lap.

Race two

Qualifying

Notes:
  – Mitch Evans' car was found underweight after Super Pole, and his lap time was deleted.
  – Jean-Éric Vergne received a twenty-place grid penalty for battery change, forcing him to start from the back of the grid. For being unable to take the full grid drop (by only losing thirteen places on the grid), he also received an additional drive-through penalty at the race.

Race

Notes:
  – Maximilian Günther, André Lotterer and Mitch Evans all received a drive-through penalty converted into 24-second time penalties after overtaking cars under the yellow flag.
  – Sébastien Buemi received a ten-second time penalty for unsafe rejoin to the track.
  – Nyck de Vries received a five-second time penalty for a technical infringement. He then received a drive-through penalty converted into a 24-second time penalty after overtaking Oliver Turvey under the yellow flag.
  – Felipe Massa received a drive-through penalty converted into a 24-second time penalty for speeding in the pit lane.
  – Ma Qinghua received a drive-through penalty converted into a 24-second time penalty for causing a collision with Nico Müller. He then received a second drive-through penalty converted into a 24-second time penalty after overtaking four cars after the safety car procedure. Ma also received a five-second penalty before the race due to his battery being below 97% on the dummy grid.
  – Oliver Turvey originally finished eighth and would have gotten promoted to sixth after all penalties having been applied, but was later disqualified as he used 40.06 kWh of total energy, exceeding the 40 kWh maximum.
  – Pole position.
  – Fastest in group stage; fastest lap.

References

|- style="text-align:center"
|width="35%"|Previous race:2019 New York City ePrix
|width="30%"|FIA Formula E Championship2019–20 season
|width="35%"|Next race:2020 Santiago ePrix
|- style="text-align:center"
|width="35%"|Previous race:2018 Ad Diriyah ePrix
|width="30%"|Diriyah ePrix
|width="35%"|Next race:2021 Diriyah ePrix
|- style="text-align:center"

2019
2019–20 Formula E season
2019 in Saudi Arabian sport
November 2019 sports events in Asia